Aclytia apicalis is a moth of the family Erebidae. It was described by Francis Walker in 1854. It is found in the Brazilian states of Amazonas and Pará.

References 

Moths described in 1854
Aclytia
Moths of South America